Westham Halt was a small railway station on the Portland Branch Railway in the west of the English county of Dorset.

History
The first piece of equipment on the site was a small ground frame on the site, installed in 1891 to control the road crossing. It was part of a scheme that saw several halts opened on the GWR and other railways to counter road competition. Services were provided by Railmotors, carriages equipped with driving ends and their own small steam engine. The station closed to passenger services with the branch in 1952.

The site today
The former trackbed of the line is located on the Rodwell Trail walk. The former platform is still located next to the site of the level crossing over Abbotsbury Road.

References

Notes

External links
Rodwell Trail
Station on navigable O.S. map located south of Radipole Lake across from Melcombe Regis and Weymouth stations

Disused railway stations in Dorset
Former Weymouth and Portland Railway stations
Railway stations in Great Britain opened in 1909
Railway stations in Great Britain closed in 1952